The Del Rio Cowboys were a Longhorn League (1948) and Rio Grande Valley League (1949-1950) baseball team based in Del Rio, Texas, United States. Dick Midkiff and Sam Harshaney played for them.

In 1954, the Bryan Indians of the Big State League moved to Del Rio and finished the 1954 season as the Del Rio Indians. The team was 17-24 at the time of the move. They finished 53-93. The franchise folded after the season.

References

Baseball teams established in 1948
Defunct minor league baseball teams
Defunct baseball teams in Texas
Del Rio, Texas
Baseball teams disestablished in 1950
1948 establishments in Texas
1950 disestablishments in Texas
Defunct Big State League teams
Longhorn League teams
Defunct Rio Grande Valley League teams